The Israel Piano Trio is a classical piano trio founded in 1972 by the pianist Alexander Volkov, the violinist Menahem Breuer, and the cellist Zvi Harell.

Formation and members

The Israel piano trio was founded in Israel in 1972 by Alexander Volkov (piano), Menahem Breuer (violin), and Zvi Harell (cello). Zvi Harell was later replaced with Marcel Bergman, and later by Hillel Zori.  After the death of Alexander Volkov in 2006, the pianist Tomer Lev joined the trio. As of 2011, the members are Roglit Ishay (piano), Menahem Breuer (violin), and Hillel Zori (cello).

Repertoire and recordings

The trio's recordings include the complete piano trios of Brahms, Mendelssohn, Schubert and Schumann, as well as works by 20th century Israeli composers. The TV documentary "Mendelssohn returns to Leipzig" features a journey of the trio to Leipzig-Gewandhaus. The trio often performed for the BBC (including live broadcasts).

Discography

 Schubert: Piano Trios, CRD 2411
 Brahms: Piano Trios, CRD 2412
 Schumann: Piano Trios, CRD 2413
 Mendelssohn: Piano Trios, CRD 3459
 Partos/Alotin/Ehrlich/Braun/Bloch/Copland, BTR 9504, 1996

References

External links
 Israel Piano Trio website

Piano trios
Musical groups established in 1972